Luciana Pezzoni (born 31 October 1928) is an Italian former gymnast. She competed in the women's artistic team all-around at the 1948 Summer Olympics.

References

External links
 

1928 births
Possibly living people
Italian female artistic gymnasts
Olympic gymnasts of Italy
Gymnasts at the 1948 Summer Olympics
People from Lodi, Lombardy
Sportspeople from the Province of Lodi